The 1932 United States presidential election in Texas took place on November 8, 1932, as part of the 1932 United States presidential election, which was held throughout all contemporary 48 states. Voters chose 23 representatives, or electors to the Electoral College, who voted for president and vice president.

Texas voted for the Democratic nominee, Governor Franklin D. Roosevelt of New York, over the Republican nominee, incumbent President Herbert Hoover of California. Roosevelt ran with Speaker of the House John Nance Garner, a Texas native while Hoover ran with incumbent Vice President Charles Curtis of Kansas.

Roosevelt defeated Hoover in the Lone Star State by a landslide margin of 76.71%. In this era, Texas was a one-party Solid South state dominated by the Democratic Party, but Roosevelt's performance was overwhelming even relative to the many prior Democratic landslides, and remains the largest blowout victory by any presidential nominee in the state. Furthermore, Roosevelt carried every single county with more than 65% of the vote, marking the only time in history that a presidential candidate has swept every county in the state of Texas.

With 88.06%, Texas would prove to be Roosevelt's fifth strongest state in popular vote percentage after South Carolina, Mississippi, Louisiana and Georgia. , this is the last election in which Kendall County voted for a Democratic presidential candidate; in fact, despite Roosevelt carrying the county with over 73% of the vote, no Democrat has since reached even 45%.

Results

Results by county

See also
 United States presidential elections in Texas

Notes

References

Texas
1932
1932 Texas elections